Fort-Liberté is an arrondissement in the Nord-Est department of Haiti. As of 2015, the population was 60,632 inhabitants. Postal codes in the Fort-Liberté Arrondissement start with the number 21.

The arondissement consists of the following communes:
 Fort-Liberté
 Ferrier
 Perches

References

Arrondissements of Haiti
Nord-Est (department)